Jalesar is  one of the 403 constituencies of the Uttar Pradesh Legislative Assembly,  India. It is a part of the Etah district and one of  the five assembly constituencies in the Agra Lok Sabha constituency. First election in this assembly constituency was held in 1957 after the "DPACO (1956)" (delimitation order) was passed in 1956. After the "Delimitation of Parliamentary and Assembly Constituencies Order" was passed in 2008, the constituency was assigned identification number 106.

Wards  / Areas
Extent of Jalesar and Awagarh as Jalesar and Awagarh assembly constituency is Awagarh Tehsil; PCs Gaharana, Bhopatpur,  Jhinvar, Rustamgarh, Dhaniga, Babsa, Nagla Khilli, Basundhara, Kheda,  Majharau of Nidholikalan KC & Nidholikalan NP of Etah Tehsil.

Members of the Legislative Assembly

Sixteenth  Legislative Assembly of Uttar Pradesh

See also
Agra Lok Sabha constituency
Etah district
Sixteenth Legislative Assembly of Uttar Pradesh
Uttar Pradesh Legislative Assembly
Vidhan Bhawan

References

External links 
 

Assembly constituencies of Uttar Pradesh
Etah district
Constituencies established in 1956